Gul Muhammad Lot is  a former member of the Senate of Pakistan.  

He was born in Diplo area, Thar. He studied in London Business School and University of Sindh. He was elected as a Member of Provincial Assembly in 1990. He served as Minister of Environment in 1993, Member of Sindh Council in 2002 and Advisor to CM Sindh for Anti-Corruption in 2008. He served as a senator in Pakistan’s senate for a tenure of 6 years from March 2009 to March 2015. He was elected unopposed. 

He is also the chairman of Mehran Group of Industries, a spice manufacturer.

References

Members of the Senate of Pakistan
Year of birth missing (living people)
Living people
Businesspeople from Sindh
Alumni of London Business School
University of Sindh alumni